Paul Raymond "Butch" Schaefer (November 7, 1911 – September 28, 1989) was professional ice hockey player who played five games in the National Hockey League. Born in Eveleth, Minnesota, he played for the Chicago Black Hawks.

External links

1911 births
1989 deaths
American men's ice hockey defensemen
Chicago Blackhawks players
Ice hockey players from Minnesota
Sportspeople from Eveleth, Minnesota